Borgström or Borgstrøm is a surname. Notable people with the surname include:

Claes Borgström (1944–2020), Swedish lawyer and Social Democratic politician
Hilda Borgström (1871–1953), Swedish stage and film actress
Hjalmar Borgstrøm (1864–1925), Norwegian composer and music critic
Inge Borgstrøm, retired female badminton player from Denmark
Mary Borgstrom (1916 – 2019), Canadian potter, ceramist, and artist

Swedish-language surnames